Taneale Christy Jane Peschel (born 29 August 1994) is an Australian cricketer who plays as a right-arm medium pace bowler and right-handed batter for Western Australia in the Women's National Cricket League (WNCL) and the Perth Scorchers in the Women's Big Bash League (WBBL). She made her debut for Western Australia on 26 October 2013 against Queensland. After a period away, she returned to Western Australia ahead of the 2016–17 WNCL season, and made her maiden half-century in her second game back against South Australia. She made her WBBL debut for the Perth Scorchers in the 2017–18 WBBL season. Peschel has also represented Australia in indoor cricket.

References

External links

Taneale Peschel at Cricket Australia

1994 births
Living people
Sportswomen from Western Australia
Cricketers from Perth, Western Australia
Australian women cricketers
Perth Scorchers (WBBL) cricketers
Western Australia women cricketers